Birnam is a rural locality in the Toowoomba Region, Queensland, Australia. In the  Birnam had a population of 65 people.

Geography
Birnam is situated north of Toowoomba,  from the central business district.

History 
The area is named after a railway station in the area, which was named after the village of Birnam in Scotland.

References

Suburbs of Toowoomba
Localities in Queensland